is the 47th single by the J-pop group Morning Musume, released on September 14, 2011, on the Zetima label. The Single V was released on September 21, 2011, a week after the CD single.

Background 
It is the last single by Morning Musume to feature Ai Takahashi.

Members at time of single 
 5th generation: Ai Takahashi , Risa Niigaki
 6th generation: Sayumi Michishige, Reina Tanaka
 8th generation: Aika Mitsui
 9th generation: Mizuki Fukumura, Erina Ikuta, Riho Sayashi, Kanon Suzuki

Kono Chikyuu no Heiwa wo Honki de Negatterun da yo! Vocalists

Main Voc: Ai Takahashi, Reina Tanaka

Center Voc: Risa Niigaki, Riho Sayashi

Minor Voc: Sayumi Michishige, Aika Mitsui, Mizuki Fukumura, Erina Ikuta

Kare to Issho ni Omise ga Shitai! Vocalists

Main Voc: Sayumi Michishige, Reina Tanaka

Center Voc: Ai Takahashi, Risa Niigaki, Aika Mitsui, Riho Sayashi

Minor Voc: Mizuki Fukumura, Erina Ikuta, Kanon Suzuki

CD single

Track listing

Regular Edition, Limited A, B, C Editions 
All songs written and composed by Tsunku.
"Kono Chikyū no Heiwa o Honki de Negatterun Da yo!" arranged by Shōichirō Hirata.
"Kare to Issho ni Omise ga Shitai!" arranged by Kaoru Ōkubo.

Ai Takahashi Graduation Commemoration Edition 
All songs written and composed by Tsunku.
"Kono Chikyū no Heiwa o Honki de Negatterun Da yo!" arranged by Shōichirō Hirata.
"Jishin Motte Yume o Motte Tobitatsu Kara" arranged by Yūsuke Itagaki.

Bonus

Limited A, B, C Editions, Ai Takahashi Graduation Commemoration Edition 
 Event ticket lottery card with a serial number

Single V

Track listing

"Kare to Issho ni Omise ga Shitai!" Event V

Track listing

Charts

References 

2011 singles
Japanese-language songs
Morning Musume songs
Songs written by Tsunku
Song recordings produced by Tsunku
Zetima Records singles
Dance-pop songs
Japanese synth-pop songs
Peace songs